Emilie Ulrich (née Boserup) (26 November 1872 – 31 January 1952) was a Danish soprano who sang leading roles at the Royal Danish Opera from 1894 until her retirement from the stage in 1917.

She was born in Frerslev, a small town near Haslev in the Zealand Region and made her stage debut on 9 May 1894 as Margherita in Arrigo Boito's Mefistofele at the Kongelige Teater in Copenhagen . Amongst the roles she created there were Michal in Carl Nielsen's Saul og David (1902) and Leonora in  Nielsen's Maskarade (1906). She also made a number of recordings in 1907–1908, including several with Vilhelm Herold.

Ulrich was appointed a Kongelige Kammersangere (Royal Chamber Singer) in 1906 and received the Ingenio et Arti medal in 1917. After her retirement she taught singing privately. She died in Copenhagen at the age of 79. Her daughter, Aase Ulrich, became a stage and film actress.

References

External links
Illustrated discography 

1872 births
1952 deaths
People from Faxe Municipality
Danish operatic sopranos
19th-century Danish women opera singers
20th-century Danish women opera singers